Alawiya Sobh (Arabic: علوية صبح) (born 1955) is a Lebanese writer and author.

Biography
Born in Beirut, Sobh studied English & Arabic Literature at the Lebanese University. Upon graduation in 1978, she pursued a career in teaching. She also began publishing articles and short stories, at first in An-Nida newspaper and then in An-Nahar. After a spell as cultural editor, she became editor-in-chief of Al-Hasnaa, a popular Arabic women's magazine, in 1986. In the early 1990s, she became editor-in-chief of women's magazine Snob Al-Hasnaa’. In 2009, Sobh served on the judging panel of the Beirut39 competition.

Sobh is now dedicating her time only to writing.

Works

Short Stories
 Slumber of Days (1986)

Novels (All novels were published originally at Dar Al Adab in their native Arabic language)
 2002 - Maryam Al-Hakaya (Maryam: Keeper of the Stories)
 2006 - Dunya (Life)
 2009 - Ismuhu Al-Gharam (It's Called Passion)
 2020 - An Taashak Al-Hayat (To Love Life)

Translations
 Maryam Al-Hayaka was translated into English by Seagull Books, into French by Gallimard and into German by Suhrkamp.
 Dunya was translated into Italian by Mondadori.
 Ismuhu Al-Gharam was translated into Italian by Mondadori and into Romanian by Polirom.<ref>{{cite web|url=http://www.polirom.ro/catalog/carte/se-numeste-pasiune-5728/|title=It's Called Passion" in Romanian|author=|archive-url=https://web.archive.org/web/20160815001559/http://www.polirom.ro/catalog/carte/se-numeste-pasiune-5728/|archive-date=2016-08-15|url-status=dead}}</ref>

Reception of work

Sobh's work has been critically acclaimed and is the subject of numerous doctoral works and literary studies. For her literary accomplishments and innovative writing, Sobh received the Sultan Qaboos prize in Oman in 2007. Her novels Dunya and Ismuhu Al-Gharam were long-listed for the Arabic Booker Prize in 2008 and 2010, respectively. In 2016, an eponymous award dubbed the "Alawiya Sobh Literary critique Award" was launched at Abdelmalek Essaâdi University in Tétouan for participants whose critiques center around Sobh's work. Maryam: Keeper of Stories was short-listed in 2019 for the EBRD Literature Prize. Sobh's cumulative work then proceeded to earn her the Al Owais Award in 2019 for the category of "Stories: Novels and Drama". Most recently in 2021, An Taashak Al-Hayat'' made the three-book short-list in Sheikh Zayed Book Award's Literature section.

References

1955 births
Writers from Beirut
Lebanese journalists
Lebanese novelists
Lebanese women writers
Lebanese University alumni
Living people
Lebanese women novelists
Lebanese women short story writers
Lebanese short story writers
Lebanese women journalists
21st-century novelists
20th-century short story writers
21st-century short story writers
20th-century Lebanese women writers
20th-century Lebanese writers
21st-century Lebanese women writers
21st-century Lebanese writers